James Doakes is a fictional character in the Dexter television series and the novels by Jeff Lindsay. In the TV series, he is portrayed by Erik King. He is a detective sergeant and police officer.

Biography
Doakes enlisted in the U.S. Army and there earned his nickname "Sane James" for his ability to detect the mentally unhinged. Doakes went on to become an Army Ranger, serving with the elite Regimental Reconnaissance Detachment. After spending many years in black operations, Doakes gave up his military career, electing instead to use his skills to help civilians as a police officer. Doakes's police career grinds to a halt when he receives excessive force citations; his volatile, angry nature proves he cannot work well with others (unless leading them). Doakes was partnered with Maria LaGuerta, which ended after she was promoted following a high-profile drug bust.

Season one
Doakes hates Dexter Morgan; he is the only person in Dexter's life who can see through his mask of normality. Doakes suspects that Dexter is hiding something, and has no reservations about telling him so. Ultimately, Doakes realizes that Dexter is withholding vital information on the Ice Truck Killer case, to the point that he is driven to physically attack him, only for Dexter to expertly fight back.

Season two
LaGuerta tells him to back off, but Doakes begins following Dexter in secret. Doakes ends his investigations when he finds Dexter attending a Narcotics Anonymous meeting, supposedly for heroin addiction; Doakes erroneously believes Dexter's dark secret is that he is a drug addict. Feeling sympathetic towards Dexter for once, Doakes briefly leaves him alone.

Doakes resumes the hunt after Debra reveals that Dexter doesn't even smoke. After Doakes starts investigating Dexter's past, Dexter goads him into a fight—seemingly unprovoked—in front of the entire squad room. Doakes is initially prepared to accept dismissal and take a high-paying security job LaGuerta set up for him, only to begin suspecting Dexter is the notorious Bay Harbor Butcher when Special Agent Frank Lundy mentions shoddy blood work as a reason for the acquittal of one of the Butcher's victims.

Doakes, in the course of following Dexter, stumbles upon Santos Jimenez's remains and Dexter's blood slide collection box, and realizes Dexter's secret: He is the Bay Harbor Butcher. Doakes becomes the prime suspect in the case when he leaves Miami to get the blood slides analyzed. Doakes attempts to apprehend Dexter himself in the Everglades, but Dexter gets the upper hand and locks him in Jimenez's cabin until he can decide what to do with him. Doakes tries to persuade Dexter to turn himself in to the police because it will protect those he cares about. Dexter considers doing it. Doakes manages to escape from his cage, but he ends up with Esteban and Teo Famosa, drug runners tied to Jimenez. They take Doakes hostage and force him to retrieve the drugs stored inside the cabin. Dexter happens upon the scene, and he and Doakes work together to take the dealers down. Immediately after this, Dexter imprisons Doakes again. In the end, Dexter's erstwhile lover Lila Tournay finds the cabin, and makes the decision for him: after finding out from Doakes that Dexter is the Bay Harbor Butcher, she tries to protect him by blowing up the cabin, thus eliminating Doakes as a witness. Doakes's incinerated remains are found along with the dismembered body of Jose Garza, and so the case is closed, with the official conclusion being Doakes was the Butcher. Later on, Lila attempts to burn Dexter along with Rita's children, but he survives and murders Lila, citing Doakes as a reason. Doakes's funeral is largely unattended, with the exception of LaGuerta, Dexter, and Doakes' mother and sisters. Doakes is replaced as sergeant by Angel Batista.

Season seven
When LaGuerta finds the blood slide with Dexter's victim Travis Marshall's blood on it, she suspects that the real Bay Harbor Butcher is still alive. Dexter, determined to stop LaGuerta, cements his frame job of Doakes by planting kill tools and plastic wrap (with Doakes's prints) at an abandoned ship yard.

In the season finale, Doakes makes an appearance, in flashbacks of previously unseen confrontations between him and Dexter set before the events of season 1, and detailing how he became suspicious of Dexter, as well as his romantic involvement with LaGuerta—a major motive behind her determination to clear his name.

New Blood
In the final episode, Angela Bishop, a small town, rural New York police chief and Dexter's ex-girlfriend, decides to call Angel Batista to question him about the Bay Harbor Butcher (Angela looked at old victims of the Bay Harbor Butcher and sees similar injection sites to the ones that two drug dealers, one killed by Dexter, have). Batista states that while he believed at the time that James Doakes was the Butcher, his ex-wife and deceased Captain María LaGuerta believed that Dexter was the Butcher. Angela then sends him a photo of her with Dexter, shocking Batista at realizing that Dexter is alive. Angela tells a shocked Batista that Dexter is in a cell, accused of murder. Batista finds a file labeled "MARIA LAGUERTA" and tells her he will be there by the morning with everything he has. Angela once again confronts Dexter, showing a pattern between the needle marks on the drug dealers and some of the Butcher's retrieved bodies, reaffirming her belief that he is the Bay Harbor Butcher. She states he will be arraigned for Matt Caldwell's murder and when Batista arrives, he will be extradited to Miami and be charged as the Bay Harbor Butcher, possibly getting the death penalty.

Differences from the novels
In the novels, Doakes's first name is "Albert", and he served in El Salvador with the United States Marine Corps Force Reconnaissance .  Dexter believes that Doakes has a "Dark Passenger" of his own, and deals with it by being as violent as he legally can in his job. After LaGuerta's murder at the end of Darkly Dreaming Dexter, Doakes believes Dexter was the killer, and tails Dexter in Dearly Devoted Dexter, intending to "catch him in the act".  Instead, Doakes himself is captured by "Dr. Danco", a psychopathic doctor who served alongside Doakes and blames him for the incarceration and torture he suffered after being betrayed to the Cubans; to get revenge, he tortures Doakes by removing his feet, hands, and tongue. In Dexter in the Dark, Doakes returns briefly, but cannot communicate.

References

External links

Dexter (series) characters
Television characters introduced in 2004
Characters in American novels of the 21st century
Fictional African-American people
Police misconduct in fiction
Fictional murderers
Fictional characters from Miami
Fictional Miami-Dade Police Department detectives
Fictional amputees
Fictional United States Army Rangers personnel
Fictional police sergeants
American male characters in television
Fictional murdered people